The Meatpacking District is a neighborhood in the New York City borough of Manhattan that runs from West 14th Street south to Gansevoort Street, and from the Hudson River east to Hudson Street. The Meatpacking Business Improvement District along with signage in the area, extend these borders farther north to West 17th Street, east to Eighth Avenue, and south to Horatio Street.

History

Pre-colonial
A Lenape trading station called Sapohanikan was on the riverbank, which, accounting for landfill, was located about where Gansevoort Street meets Washington Street today. The footpath that led from Sapohanikan inland to the east became the foundation for Gansevoort Street, which by accident or design aligns, within one degree, so that the Manhattanhenge phenomenon, where the setting sun crosses the horizon looking down the street, occurs at the spring and autumnal equinoxes. In recognition of this history, petitions were made to call the 14th Street Park "Saphohanikan Park", although it appears no formal recognition was given.

Initial development
The earliest development of the area now known as the Meatpacking District came in the mid-19th century. Before that it was the location of Fort Gansevoort and of the upper extension of Greenwich Village, which had been a vacation spot until overtaken by the northward movement of New York City. The irregular street patterns in the area resulted from the clash of the Greenwich Village street system with that of the Commissioners' Plan of 1811, which sought to impose a regular grid on the undeveloped part of Manhattan island.

Construction of residences in the neighborhood – primarily rowhouses and town houses, some of which were later converted into tenements – began around 1840, primarily in the Greek Revival style which was prominent at the time. By mid-century, with Fort Gansevoort replaced by freight yards of the Hudson River Railroad, a neighborhood developed which was part heavy industry and part residential – a pattern which was more typical of an earlier period in the city's history but which was becoming less usual, as industry and residences began to be isolated in their own districts. In the western portion of the neighborhood, heavy industry such as iron works and a terra cotta manufacturer could be found, while lighter industry such as carpentry and woodworking, lumber yards, paint works, granite works and a plaster mill blended into the residential area. At the time of the Civil War the part of the district west of Ninth Avenue and Greenwich Street and above 10th Street was the location of numerous distilleries making turpentine and camphene, a lamp fuel.

After the Civil War
When development began again after the war in the 1870s, the tenor of the neighborhood changed. Since it was no longer considered a desirable area to live in, construction of single-family residences was replaced with the building of multiple-family dwellings, and the continued internal industrialization increased. In addition an elevated railroad line had been constructed through the neighborhood along Ninth Avenue and Greenwich Street, completed in 1869. Additional development began in the 1880s when two new markets began operating in the area. On the old freight yards, the Gansevoort Market (originally the "Farmer's Market"), an open-air space for the buying and selling of regional produce started in 1879, and the West Washington Market, 10 brick buildings used for meat, poultry and dairy transactions, relocated to the river side of West Street in 1884. By 1900 the area was home to 250 slaughterhouses and packing plants, and by the 1920s what had been a neighborhood based on mixture of marketplaces became more tightly focused on meatpacking and related activities – although other industries continued to be located there, including cigar-making, transportation-related businesses such as automobile repair, express services and garages, import-export firms, marine supplies, cosmetics, printing and many others. After decades of debate, the High Line elevated freight line was authorized in 1929 as part of the "West Side Improvement Plan", and the New York Central Railroad completed construction, passing through the neighborhood, in 1934.

Decline and resurgence
The area's decline began around the 1960s as part of the general decline of the waterfront area. Containerization of freight; the advent of supermarkets which changed the distribution pattern for meat, dairy and produce from a locally or regionally based system to a more national one; and the development of frozen foods and refrigerated trucks to deliver them were all factors in this, but meatpacking continued to be the major activity in the neighborhood through the 1970s. At the same time a new "industry", nightclubs and other entertainment and leisure operations catering to a gay clientele, began to spring up in the area.

In the 1980s, as the industrial activities in the area continued their downturn, it became known as a center for drug dealing and prostitution, particularly involving transsexuals. Concurrent with the rise in illicit sexual activity, the sparsely populated industrial area became the focus of the city's burgeoning BDSM subculture; over a dozen sex clubs – including such notable ones as The Anvil, The Manhole, the Mineshaft, and the heterosexual-friendly Hellfire Club – flourished in the area. Many of these establishments were under the direct control of the Mafia or subject to NYPD protection rackets. In 1985 the Mineshaft was forcibly shuttered by the city at the height of AIDS preventionism.

Beginning in the late 1990s, the Meatpacking District went through a transformation. High-end boutiques catering to young professionals and hipsters opened, including Diane von Fürstenberg, Christian Louboutin, Alexander McQueen, Stella McCartney, Barbour, Rubin & Chapelle, Theory, Ed Hardy, Puma, Moschino, ADAM by Adam Lippes, and an Apple Store; restaurants such as Pastis—which closed in 2014—and 5 Ninth; and nightclubs such as Tenjune. In 2004, New York magazine called the Meatpacking District "New York’s most fashionable neighborhood".

A catalyst for even greater transformation of the area was the opening in June 2009 of the first segment of the High Line linear park. A former elevated freight railroad built under the aegis of Robert Moses, it opened to great reviews in the District (and in Chelsea to the north) as a greenway modeled after Paris's Promenade Plantée. Thirteen months earlier, the Whitney Museum of American Art had announced that it would build a second, Renzo Piano-designed home at 99 Gansevoort Street, just west of Washington Street and adjacent to the southernmost entrance to the High Line; and on May 1, 2015, the museum opened at this site. These were turning points in the changes experienced by the neighborhood over the first two decades of the 21st century, transforming it from a gritty manufacturing district into a bustling high-end retail, dining, and residential area, as documented by photographer Brian Rose in his 2014 book Metamorphosis.

Preservation
In September 2003 the New York City Landmarks Preservation Commission (LPC) established the Gansevoort Market Historic District, and in 2007 New York State Parks Commissioner Carol Ash approved adding the entire Meatpacking District, an area which included both the Gansevoort Market Historic District and the neighborhood's waterfront,  to the New York State and National Registers of Historic Places. The state district was listed on the National Register on May 30, 2007 and included 140 buildings, two structures, and one other site.

Gallery

See also
Chelsea, Manhattan
Greenwich Village
High Line (New York City)
The Standard, High Line

References
Explanatory notes

Citations

External links

 Meatpacking District Improvement Association website

 
Neighborhoods in Manhattan
Warehouse districts of the United States
Economy of New York City
Historic districts on the National Register of Historic Places in Manhattan
New York City Designated Landmarks in Manhattan
New York City designated historic districts
Adaptive reuse of industrial structures in New York City